The 1984–85 WHL season was the 19th season for the Western Hockey League.  Fourteen teams completed a 72-game season.  The Prince Albert Raiders won the President's Cup before going on to win the Memorial Cup.

League notes
The Winnipeg Warriors relocated to Moose Jaw, Saskatchewan to become the Moose Jaw Warriors.
The Kamloops Junior Oilers became the Kamloops Blazers.

Regular season

Final standings

Scoring leaders
Note: GP = Games played; G = Goals; A = Assists; Pts = Points; PIM = Penalties in minutes

1985 WHL Playoffs

First round
Prince Albert earned a bye
Medicine Hat earned a bye
Regina defeated Saskatoon 3 games to 0
Calgary defeated Lethbridge 3 games to 1

Division semi-finals
Prince Albert defeated Calgary 4 games to 0
Medicine Hat defeated Regina 4 games to 1
Kamloops defeated Portland 5 games to 1
New Westminster defeated Kelowna 5 games to 1

Division finals
Prince Albert defeated Medicine Hat 4 games to 1
Kamloops defeated New Westminster 5 games to 0

WHL Championship
Prince Albert defeated Kamloops 4 games to 0

All-Star game

There was no All-Star Game in 1984–85.

WHL awards

All-Star Teams

See also
1985 Memorial Cup
1985 NHL Entry Draft
1984 in sports
1985 in sports

References
whl.ca
 2005–06 WHL Guide

Western Hockey League seasons
WHL
WHL